Mallika is a Muslim/urdu Indian feminine given name, which means "jasmine". Notable people with the name include:
Mallika (actress), Indian actress
Mallika Chabba (born 1985), Indian painter
Mallika Chopra (born 1971), American author and businesswoman
Mallika Dutt (born 1962), Indian human rights activist
Mallika Kapoor (born 1985), Indian actress
Mallika Sarabhai (born 1954), Indian dancer and activist
Mallika Sengupta (1960–2011), Indian poet
Mallika Sherawat (born 1976), Indian actress
Mallika Srinivasan (born 1959), Indian businesswoman
Mallika Sukumaran (born 1954), Indian actress
 Mallika Badrinath, Indian cookery book author

See also
Malika (given name)

References

Indian feminine given names
Gujarati given names
Hindu given names
Tamil given names